CÓRus is Ireland's largest choir, founded by Mary Lowe and Yvonne McDonald. In 2013, they performed on The Late Late Show.

References

External links
 Official website

Irish choirs